Beiuș may refer to several places in Bihor County, Romania:

Beiuș, a city
Lazuri de Beiuș, a commune
Uileacu de Beiuș, a commune, and its village of Vălanii de Beiuș
Poclușa de Beiuș, Sânnicolau de Beiuș and Urviș de Beiuș, villages in Șoimi Commune